Beaver Township is one of twelve townships in Humboldt County, Iowa, USA.  As of the 2000 census, its population was 351. Beaver Township also contains the county seat of Humboldt County, Dakota City.

History
Beaver Township was organized in 1878.

Geography

Cities, towns, villages
 Dakota City

Adjacent townships
 Grove Township (north)
 Lake Township (northeast)
 Norway Township (east)
 Newark Township, Webster County (southeast)
 Badger Township, Webster County (south)
 Deer Creek Township, Webster County (southwest)
 Corinth Township (west)
 Rutland Township (northwest)

Cemeteries
The township contains both East Beaver Cemetery and Zion Cemetery.

Political districts
 Iowa's 4th congressional district
 State House District 4

References
 United States Census Bureau 2008 TIGER/Line Shapefiles
 United States Board on Geographic Names (GNIS)
 United States National Atlas

External links
 US-Counties.com
 City-Data.com

Townships in Humboldt County, Iowa
Populated places established in 1878
Townships in Iowa
1878 establishments in Iowa